Gaurav Dhingra (born 24 March 1980) is an International film and television producer and film entrepreneur.

He is the Founder of Jungle Book Entertainment along with Pan Nalin, director of award-winning films like Samsara and Valley of Flowers.

In 2015, he produced Angry Indian Goddesses, touted as India's first female buddy film and the recipient of the People's Choice Award at Toronto International Film Festival and BNL People's Choice Award at the 10th Rome Film Festival. It was sold theatrically in 67 countries and was acquired by Netflix Worldwide.

Under the Jungle Book Entertainment banner, Gaurav also produced the critically acclaimed documentary, Faith Connections and the India-New Zealand co-production, Beyond the Known World, starring David Wenham.

He is recognised as a part of the new wave of Independent Indian cinema. He has also co-produced films like Haraamkhor, Vakratunda Mahakaaya and Peddlers. Peddlers, premiered to critical acclaim at Cannes and Haraamkhor was a critical and commercial success.

In the television sphere, Gaurav has been associated with 15-time Emmy Award-winning reality show, the Amazing Race for over a decade as well as Producing top international reality shows, Ice Road Truckers: Deadliest Roads (season 1) for History Channel and World's Toughest Truckers (India Episodes) for Discovery & Channel 5.

In 2013 he was selected to represent India at the Trans Atlantic Partners (TAP), the intensive training and networking programme for European Canadian and American producers. TAP is supported by the MEDIA Mundus Programme of the European Union, by Telefilm Canada, and VFF (Verwertungsgesellschaft der Film- und Fernsehproduzenten mbH) Germany.

Early days
Gaurav did his Post Graduate Diploma in Content Creation and Management (PGDCCM) from School Of Convergence, New Delhi. He went on to assist Producer Bobby Bedi of Kaleidoscope Entertainment. Learning the craft and nuances of Film making and production by taking on various roles for Mangal Pandey: The Rising, Maqbool, Valley of Flowers, The Myth (film) and American Daylight.

Prior to his foray into the entertainment industry he was an active sportsperson and mountaineer, playing as a wicketkeeper for the India A cricket team and curating mountaineering tours while still at school.

2010 onwards

Mixed Media Productions
While working as part of the core team that produced the Amazing Race, Gaurav met Aparna Sanyal, with whom he founded Mixed Media Productions and Oasis Television in 2010. Mixed Media productions has made public service ads, films for governmental organizations, NGOs and the UNDP.

Oasis Television Pvt. Ltd
In 2010, under Oasis, Gaurav produced the Indian chapter of the US reality show Ice Road Truckers: Deadliest Roads with History Channel. Oasis also produced the Indian segment of the reality series World's Toughest Trucker in 2012. IRT was said to be the biggest international television series to be shot in India at the time, with shooting taking place in Himachal Pradesh.

Oasis Motion Pictures Pvt. Ltd
Gaurav produced a spate of independent feature films under the Oasis Motion Pictures banner. He teamed up with Sikhya Entertainment to produce two critically lauded films, Peddlers (Official Selection - Cannes Film Festival) and Haraamkhor, which premiered to critical acclaim at the New York Indian Film Festival (NYIFF).

Jungle Book Entertainment Pvt. Ltd
In November 2012, Gaurav founded Jungle Book Entertainment along with critically acclaimed director Pan Nalin with an objective to produce Globally resonating Indian stories.

Faith Connections (2013)
The first project of Jungle Book Entertainment was a feature documentary Faith Connections, set in the Kumbh festival that is the largest human gathering on earth. It was sold to over 28 countries, released theatrically across Europe and USA, and won unanimous critical praise at TIFF and IFFLA.

Angry Indian Goddesses (2015)
Gaurav independently produced, financed and distributed India's first female buddy film Angry Indian Goddesses directed by Pan Nalin, which won the Prestigious People's Choice Award (Runner Up) at the Toronto International Film Festival 2015, and won audience awards in premium festivals. It was picked up for global sales by Mongrel International (Canada) and has sold theatrically to over 67 countries, and bought by Netflix worldwide.

Beyond The Known World (2017)
For the latest Production, Gaurav put together the first ever India-New Zealand co-production, Beyond The Known World directed by Pan Nalin, starring Australian star David Wenham and French star Emmanuelle Beart, which was released in Australia and New Zealand in 2017 to unanimous critical appreciation. Currently the film is gearing up for an International release slated to the end of 2019.

Filmography

Credits

Television

 The Amazing Race US (2001–Present) TV Series (Line Producer - Multiple Seasons)
 The Amazing Race Asia (2006–Present) TV Series (Line Producer - Seasons 1, 3 & 5)
 The Amazing Race Australia (2011–Present) TV Series (Line Producer - Season 1)
 The Amazing Race Norway (2012–Present) TV Series (Line Producer - Season 1)
 The Amazing Race Israel (2009–Present) TV Series (Line Producer - Season 5)
 The Amazing Race China (2014–Present) TV Series (Line Producer - Season 1)
 World's Toughest Trucker (2012) Reality TV Series (Line Producer - Season 1)
 Ice Road Truckers: Deadliest Roads (2010) TV series (Line Producer - Season 1)
 Survivor (2010) TV Series (Line Producer - Season 7 and 8)

Feature films
 For Real (2009) (Line Producer)
 Delhi-6 (2009) (Line Producer)
 Mere Khwabon Mein Jo Aaye (2009) (Line Producer)
 The 19th Step (Feature Film) (2008) (Line Producer)
 Valley of Flowers (2006) (Production Manager)
 Rang De Basanti (2006) (Production Manager)
 Mangal Pandey: The Rising (2005) (Production Manager)
 American Daylight (2004) (Production Manager)
 Maqbool (2003) (Production Manager)

References

1980 births
Living people
Indian television executives
Indian film producers
Indian television producers
Film producers from Mumbai
Indian theatre directors
Hindi film producers
Primetime Emmy Award winners